The Buffalo was an American automobile manufactured from 1900 until 1902, by the Buffalo Automobile and Auto-Bi Company of Buffalo, New York.

Two models were made, the Junior with a 3.5 hp, and the Senior with 6 hp single-cylinder engines. The company also produced an "Auto.Bi", a two-wheeled motorcycle.

In 1903 the company was taken over by the E.R. Thomas Motor Company. They combined with Fort Plain
Spring and Axel which also made 1 Cylinder Runabouts, Dr. Runabouts.

It had no connection with the Buffalo Electric Carriage Company which built cars in Buffalo at the same time.

References

David Burgess Wise, The New Illustrated Encyclopedia of Automobiles.
Scientific American, Volume 80, number 9-March, 1902

Cars introduced in 1901
Defunct motor vehicle manufacturers of the United States
Motor vehicle manufacturers based in New York (state)
Companies based in Buffalo, New York
Vehicle manufacturing companies established in 1901
Vehicle manufacturing companies disestablished in 1903
1901 establishments in New York (state)
1903 disestablishments in New York (state)
Defunct companies based in New York (state)
1900s cars
Veteran vehicles